Yves Brasseur (26 February 1943 – 11 August 2005) was a Belgian fencer. He competed in the individual sabre events at the 1964 and 1968 Summer Olympics. The Challenge Yves Brasseur has been organized to celebrate his memory and takes place every year in Gent.

References

1943 births
2005 deaths
Belgian male fencers
Belgian sabre fencers
Olympic fencers of Belgium
Fencers at the 1964 Summer Olympics
Fencers at the 1968 Summer Olympics
Sportspeople from Ghent